Dead Mare Wash is a valley in the Dixie National Forest in south-central Garfield County, Utah, United States.

Dead Mare Wash was so named on account of a mare which was found dead there.

See also

 Arroyo (creek)
 List of rivers of Utah
 List of valleys of Utah

References

Rivers of Utah
Valleys of Utah
Rivers of Garfield County, Utah
Landforms of Garfield County, Utah
Dixie National Forest